The 1998 United States Senate election in Iowa was held November 3, 1998. Incumbent Republican United States Senator Chuck Grassley sought re-election to a fourth term in the United States Senate, running against former State Representative David Osterberg, who won the Democratic nomination unopposed. Grassley had not faced a competitive election since 1980; this year proved no different, and Grassley defeated Osterberg in a landslide.

Democratic primary

Candidates 
 David Osterberg, former State Representative

Results

Republican primary

Candidates 
 Chuck Grassley, incumbent United States Senator

Results

General election

Results

See also 
 1998 United States Senate elections

References 

United States Senate
Iowa
1998